Frederikshaab Glacier is a glacier on the southwest coast of Greenland in the Sermersooq municipality. It flows from Greenland's ice sheet and at its mouth melts into various ponds and channels that empty into Davis Strait.

Glaciers of Greenland